The 2017 Oceania Women's Handball Champions Cup was the first since 2010 and first ever held in Australia. It was held at Geelong, Victoria and was held in conjunction with the 2017 Australian Handball Club Championship.

The event saw seven teams from three nations. The eventual winner was AS Dumbea from New Caledonia. They were runners up in the 2010 championship and this was their first win. Runners up were 2016 Australian Champions and co-hosts Melbourne HC. Third place was Australian side University of Technology Sydney who beat Auckland in the play off. Fifth were co-hosts Deakin/Southside, then New Zealand team Canterbury Quakes and Sydney University seventh.

Results

Round Robin - Pool A

Round Robin - Pool B

Grading 5th - 7th place

Semi-finals

Third place play-off

Grand Final

Rankings

References

 Lead up report on International Handball Federation webpage. 5 May 2017
 Results on official webpage
 Tables on official webpage
 Report on International Handball Federation webpage. 15 May 2017
 Report on Handball Australia webpage. May 2017

External links
 Official webpage

Oceania Handball Champions Cup
Oceania Women's Handball Champions Cup